Malin Ahlberg (born 3 August 1991) is a Swedish footballer forward.

References

External links 
 

1991 births
Living people
Swedish women's footballers
Mallbackens IF players
Damallsvenskan players
Women's association football forwards
Women's association football defenders